The Soviet women's football championship were competitions among women's football teams in the late Soviet Union and were conducted by the Football Federation of the Soviet Union. The championship consisted of three tiers (Higher, First and Second leagues) with each having two or more groups.

Football competitions among women were conducted before, but in 1990 an official championship was established. In 1989, there took place competitions among teams of trade unions involving some 60 teams. After two seasons the championship was discontinued due to the dissolution of the Soviet Union. Most of the Russia-based clubs formed the new Russian Women's Football Championship; clubs based in former Soviet republics based in Europe formed their own leagues, while those in Central Asia either dissolved or moved to Russia, as local federations did not allow women's football for many years, or none at all to date.

Champions

See also
Russian Women's Football Championship, successor.

References

External links
Soviet women's football championship at RSSSF

 

women
Women's League
1991 disestablishments in the Soviet Union
Defunct top level women's association football leagues in Europe